Escuela Hispano Árabe de Tánger was a Spanish football club based in Tangier, in Morocco.

History
Founded in 1939 as a merger between the Spanish and the Moroccan teams of Hogar Español de Tánger, the club played its first season in the Segunda División thanks to the help of the city during the Spanish Civil War. Finishing last of the group 5, the club was relegated to Tercera División but never played in the category, opting to play in the regional leagues until its dissolution in 1941.

Season to season

1 season in Segunda División

References

External links
ArefePedia team profile 

La futbolteca team profile 

Futbol regional profile 

Defunct football clubs in Spain
Spanish Africa
Association football clubs established in 1939
Association football clubs disestablished in 1943
1939 establishments in Spain
1943 disestablishments in Spain
Segunda División clubs
History of Tangier
Sport in Tangier